The so-called "Veil of St. Anne", also known as the "Arab Standard", is the mantle of a Fatimid caliph, Al-Mustaʽli, from 1096/97, that was brought to the Provence after the First Crusade, from Damietta and deposited at the treasury of the Cathedral of St. Anne at Apt. For a long time it was considered as a Christian relic; today it is recognized as one of the chief surviving examples of Fatimid art.

Notes

Sources 
 
 
 
 
 
 
 
 

Art of the Fatimid Caliphate
1090s works
Textiles